In retail, an "anchor tenant", sometimes called an "anchor store", "draw tenant", or "key tenant", is a considerably larger tenant in a shopping mall, often a department store or retail chain. They are typically located at the ends of malls, sometimes in the middle. With their broad appeal, they are intended to attract a significant cross-section of the shopping public to the center. They are often offered steep discounts on rent in exchange for signing long-term leases in order to provide steady cash flows for the mall owners. Some examples of anchor stores in the United States are: Macy's, Sears, JCPenney, Nordstrom, Neiman Marcus, Saks Fifth Avenue, Kohl's, and Target. And in Canada; Hudson's Bay, Sears (formerly), Target (formerly), Zellers (formerly, now in select Bay locations), Nordstrom/Nordstrom Rack (closing in 2023), TJX Companies (HomeSense, Winners, Marshalls), Saks Fifth Avenue, Sporting Life.

Origins 
When the planned shopping centre format was developed by Victor Gruen in the early to mid-1950s, signing larger department stores was necessary for the financial stability of the projects, and to draw retail traffic that would result in visits to the smaller shops in the centre as well.  Anchors generally have their rents heavily discounted, and may even receive cash inducements from the centre to remain open.

Early on, grocery stores were a common type of anchor store, since they are visited often. However, research on consumer behavior revealed that most trips to the grocery store did not result in visits to surrounding shops . Large supermarkets remain common anchor stores within power centers however.

As of 2005, the declining popularity of old-line department stores makes it necessary for mall management companies to consider re-anchoring with other retail alternatives, or mix commercial development with residential development to guarantee a captive clientele.

The challenges faced by the traditional large department stores have led to a resurgence in the use of supermarkets and even gyms as anchors.

Classification 

The regional center typically has two or more anchors, while the superregional typically has three or more.

In each case, the anchors account for 50–70% of the centre's leasable space.

Culture 
Shopping centres with anchor stores have consistently outperformed those without one, as the anchor helps draw shoppers initially attracted to the anchor to shop at other shops in the mall. Thus, a mall which loses its last anchor is often considered to be a dead mall.

See also

 Retail
 Shopping centre
 Supermarket

References

Retail formats
Commercial real estate
Department stores